Lost Without You may refer to:


Music

Albums
Lost Without You: Motown Lost & Found, by The Four Tops

Songs
"Lost Without You" (Delta Goodrem song), 2003
"Lost Without You" (Freya Ridings song), 2017
"Lost Without U", a song by Robin Thicke
"Lost Without You", song by Johnny Carroll
"Lost Without You", song by Clarence "Frogman" Henry
"Lost Without You", song by Kylie Minogue from Golden
"Lost Without You", song by Vanessa Williams from Next

See also
 I'm Lost Without You (disambiguation)